Speed skating at the 1964 Winter Olympics, was held from 30 January to 7 February. Eight events were contested at the Eisschnelllaufbahn Innsbruck.

Medal summary

Medal table

The Soviet Union led the medal table with five gold and twelve total, with four of the gold medals won by Lidiya Skoblikova, who swept the women's events.

North Korea's Han Pil-Hwa was the first medalist for her country in the Olympics, and the first Asian woman to win a medal in the Winter Olympics.

Skoblikova easily led the individual medal table, while Knut Johannesen was the most successful male skater with one gold and one bronze medal.

Men's events

Women's events

Records

Five new Olympic records were set in Innsbruck.

Participating NOCs

Twenty-two nations competed in the speed skating events at Innsbruck. Mongolia and North Korea made their Olympic speed skating debuts.

References

 
1964 Winter Olympics events
1964
1964 in speed skating
Olympics, 1964